The Wheel of Time is a series of high fantasy novels by American author Robert Jordan, with Brandon Sanderson as a co-author for the final three novels. Originally planned as a six-book series at its debut in 1990, The Wheel of Time came to span 14 volumes, in addition to a prequel novel and two companion books. Jordan died in 2007 while working on what was planned to be the final volume in the series. He prepared extensive notes which enabled fellow fantasy author Brandon Sanderson to complete the final book, which grew into three volumes: The Gathering Storm (2009), Towers of Midnight (2010), and A Memory of Light (2013).

The series draws on numerous elements of both European and Asian mythology, most notably the cyclical nature of time found in Buddhism and Hinduism; the metaphysical concepts of balance, duality, and a respect for nature found in Taoism; the Abrahamic concepts of God and Satan; and Leo Tolstoy's War and Peace.

The Wheel of Time is notable for its length, detailed imaginary world, and magic system, and its large cast of characters. The eighth through fourteenth books each reached number one on the New York Times Best Seller list. After its completion, the series was nominated for a Hugo Award. , the series has sold over 90 million copies worldwide, making it one of the best-selling epic fantasy series since The Lord of the Rings. Its popularity has spawned a collectible card game, a video game, a roleplaying game, and a soundtrack album. A TV series adaptation produced by Sony Pictures and Amazon Studios premiered in 2021.

Setting

The series is set in an unnamed world that, due to the cyclical nature of time as depicted in the series, is simultaneously the distant past and the distant future Earth. Fans have come to refer to this world as the Randlands (from the name of the central character) or the World of the Wheel (cf. a section of the companion book The World of Robert Jordan's The Wheel of Time).

Premise
At the dawn of time, a deity known as the Creator forged the universe and the Wheel of Time, which spins the Pattern of the Ages using the lives of men and women as its threads. The Wheel has seven spokes, each representing an age, and it is rotated by the One Power, which flows from the True Source. The One Power is divided into male and female halves, saidin and saidar, which work in opposition and in unison to drive the Wheel. Humans who can use its power are known as channelers; their principal organization is called the Aes Sedai or "Servants of All" in the Old Tongue.

The Creator imprisoned its antithesis, "Shai'tan", the Dark One, at the moment of creation, sealing him away from the Wheel. However, in a time called the Age of Legends, an Aes Sedai experiment inadvertently breached the Dark One's prison, allowing his influence to seep back into the world. He rallied the proud, the corrupt, and the ambitious to his cause and these servants began an effort to fully free the Dark One from his prison, so he might remake time and reality in his own image. In response to this threat, the Wheel spun out the Dragon, a channeler of immense power, to be a champion for the Light. In the Age of Legends, the Dragon was a man named Lews Therin Telamon, who eventually rose to command the Aes Sedai and their allies in the struggle against the Dark One's forces. After a grueling 10-year war, Lews Therin led his forces to victory in a daring assault on the volcano of Shayol Ghul (the site of the earthly link to the Dark One's prison) and was able to reseal the prison. However, at the moment of victory, the Dark One was able to taint saidin, driving male channelers of the One Power insane. Lews Therin killed his friends and family and then, by intentionally overloading himself with the One Power, killed himself. The other male channelers devastated the world with the One Power, unleashing earthquakes and tidal waves that reshaped the world. Eventually, the last male channeler was killed or cut off from the One Power, leaving the human race all but destroyed and only women able to wield the One Power safely. The Aes Sedai reconstituted and guided humanity out of this dark time. Mankind now lived under the shadow of a prophecy that the Dark One would break free from his prison and the Dragon would be reborn to fight him once more, and although he is humanity's only hope against the Dark One, he would devastate the world a second time in the process.

After a span of three and a half thousand years, the human race has rebuilt a level of technology roughly comparable to that of the Late Middle Ages or Early Modern Era, though with a higher level of general education and understanding of hygiene and anatomy, but nevertheless an almost complete lack of formal science, industrial production, and academic institutions. This can be traced to the post-apocalyptic nature of the world, where much knowledge has survived, but the structures and institutions that made that knowledge possible were destroyed. One major difference from our history is that women enjoy full equality with men in most societies, and are superior in some. This is attributed to the power and prestige of the female-only Aes Sedai influencing the larger society.

Several major wars have ravaged the main continent since the defeat of the Dark One, such as the Trolloc Wars, when the surviving servants of the Dark One tried to destroy civilization once more but were defeated by an alliance of nations led by the Aes Sedai; and the War of the Hundred Years, a devastating civil war that followed the fall of a continent-spanning empire ruled by the high king, Artur Hawkwing. These wars have prevented the human race from regaining the power and high technology of the Age of Legends and also left humanity divided. Even the prestige of the Aes Sedai has fallen, with their shrinking numbers and the emergence of rival organizations such as the Children of the Light, a military order who believe that all who channel the One Power are servants of the Shadow. The nations of the modern era are able to unite in defense against the warrior-clans of the Aiel, who cross into the western kingdoms on a mission of vengeance after they suffer a grievous insult, but are too divided to work effectively together in other areas.

Plot summary
The prequel novel, New Spring, takes place during the Aiel War and chronicles the end of the conflict. The Aes Sedai discover that the Prophecies of the Dragon have been fulfilled and the Dragon has been Reborn. Aes Sedai agents are dispatched to try and find the newborn child before servants of the Shadow can do the same.

The series proper commences almost 20 years later in the Two Rivers district of the kingdom of Andor, a near-forgotten backwater. A young sheep herder named Rand al’Thor (the series protagonist) and his father Tam al’Thor travel to the nearby town of Emond's Field to deliver cider. Rand, keen to further explore his romance with the mayor's daughter, Egwene al’Vere, becomes caught up with an Aes Sedai called Moiraine Damodred, and her Warder, Lan, after his father sustains a serious wound. Rand and his friends, Matrim "Mat" Cauthon and Perrin Aybara discover from Moiraine that servants of the Dark One are searching for one particular young man living in the area. Unfortunately, Moiraine is unable to determine which of three men it is: Rand himself, Mat, or Perrin, and so takes all three of them out of the Two Rivers district along with his romantic interest Egwene (whom Moiraine has determined can channel the One Power and would teach to be Aes Sedai) and the village "Wisdom" (a local healer) Nynaeve al'Meara after a terrible battle with creatures created by The Dark One. The first novel depicts their flight from various agents of the Shadow and their attempts to escape to the Aes Sedai city of Tar Valon.

From then, the story expands and protagonist Rand, as well as the other characters, are frequently split into different groups, pursuing different missions or agendas aimed at furthering the cause of the Dragon Reborn, sometimes thousands of miles apart. Broadly speaking, the original group of characters from the Two Rivers make new allies, gain experience, and become figures of some influence and authority. As they struggle to unite the western kingdoms against the Dark One's forces, their task is complicated by rulers of the nations who refuse to give up their authority and by factions such as the Children of the Light, who do not believe in the prophecies, and the Seanchan, the people of a long-lost colony of Artur Hawkwing's empire across the western ocean who have returned, believing it is their destiny to conquer the world. The Aes Sedai also become divided between those who believe the Dragon Reborn should be strictly controlled and those who believe he must lead them into battle as he did in the earlier war. As the story expands, new characters representing different factions are introduced; although this expansion of the narrative allows the sheer scale of the growing struggle to be effectively depicted, it has been criticized for slowing the pace of the novels and sometimes reducing the appearances of the original or main cast to extended cameos.

By the eleventh novel, it has become clear that the Last Battle, caused when the Dark One is able to exert its influence directly on the world once more, is imminent. The Last Battle is depicted in the fourteenth and final novel in the series, A Memory of Light.

Books in the series 

All paperback (PB) page totals given are for the most widely available mass-market paperback editions. The page count for the hardback (HB) editions does not include a glossary or appendix, page counts.

In 2002 the first book, The Eye of the World, was repackaged as two volumes with new illustrations for younger readers: From the Two Rivers, including an extra chapter (Ravens) before the existing prologue, and To the Blight with an expanded glossary. In 2004 the same was done with The Great Hunt, with the two parts being The Hunt Begins and New Threads in the Pattern.

Prologue eBooks
On several occasions, chapters from various books in the series were released several months in advance of publication. These were released in eBook format as promotional tools for the then-upcoming release.

The prologue eBook releases included:
 Snow: The Prologue to Winter's Heart (September 2000)
 Glimmers: The Prologue to Crossroads of Twilight (July 17, 2002)
 Embers Falling on Dry Grass: The Prologue to Knife of Dreams (July 22, 2005).
 What the Storm Means: The Prologue to The Gathering Storm (September 17, 2009).
 Chapter 1 of The Gathering Storm, Tears from Steel, was released free on Friday September 4, 2009 on Tor.com
 Chapter 2 of The Gathering Storm, The Nature of Pain, was released in Audio form free on Thursday September 24, 2009 on Tor.com
 Distinctions: The Prologue to Towers of Midnight (Tuesday September 21, 2010).
 Chapter 1 of Towers of Midnight, Apples First, was released free on Friday October 1, 2010 on Tor.com
 Chapter 2 of Towers of Midnight, Questions of Leadership was released in Audio form free on Tuesday October 19, 2010
 Chapter 8 of Towers of Midnight, The Seven-Striped Lass (on September 16, 2010, Chapter 8, The Seven-Striped Lass, was revealed as part of The Great Hunt scavenger hunt setup by Brandon on his website beginning August 30, 2010 in relation to his new book: The Way of Kings).
 By Grace And Banners Fallen: The Prologue to A Memory Of Light (Wednesday September 19, 2012).
 A segment of chapter 1 of A Memory Of Light was released in mid-2012 on Dragonmount.com
 A segment of chapter 11 of A Memory Of Light was similarly released publicly in mid-2012 on Dragonmount.com

Short stories
Jordan wrote two short stories within the franchise in the late 1990s. The first, The Strike at Shayol Ghul, predates the main series by several thousand years. It was made available on the Internet and was later published in The World of Robert Jordan's The Wheel of Time. Jordan also wrote a short story entitled New Spring, for the 1998 Legends anthology edited by Robert Silverberg. Jordan later expanded this into the stand-alone novel New Spring that was published in January 2004.

During Brandon Sanderson's work on A Memory of Light, two sections of the book were cut and later published as short stories in anthologies. The first, River of Souls, was published in Unfettered: Tales by Masters of Fantasy (2013). The second, A Fire Within the Ways was published in Unfettered III in 2019. Unlike "River of Souls", "A Fire Within the Ways" is not considered canon.

Encyclopedic works
Tor Books published a companion book to the series, entitled The World of Robert Jordan's The Wheel of Time, in November 1997, which contains much hitherto unrevealed background information about the series including the first maps of the entire world and the Seanchan home continent. Jordan co-authored the book with Teresa Patterson. Jordan ruled the book broadly canonical but stated that it was written from the perspective of an historian within The Wheel of Time universe and was prone to errors of bias and guesswork.

On November 3, 2015, The Wheel of Time Companion: The People, Places, and History of the Bestselling Series was released in hardback format, written by Harriet McDougal, Alan Romanczuk, and Maria Simons from Tor Books. Alan Romanczuk and Maria Simons were Robert Jordan's editorial assistants. The book is an encapsulating glossary of the entire series. The authors began compiling material for the volume as early as 2005, and the final book was released after the series' conclusion.

Origins of The Wheel of Time by Michael Livingston was released on November 8, 2022.

Development

Writing and conception

The novel proved extremely difficult to write because characters and storylines changed considerably during the writing process. The series was originally centered on an older man who discovered relatively late in life that he was the 'chosen one' who had to save the world. However, Jordan deliberately decided to move closer to the tone and style of J. R. R. Tolkien's The Fellowship of the Ring and made the characters younger and less experienced. Once this decision had been made, writing proceeded much more easily and Jordan completed the second volume, The Great Hunt, at roughly the same time the first book was published.

Jordan wrote full-time at breakneck speed for the next several years until he completed the seventh volume, A Crown of Swords, at which point he slowed down, delivering a book every two years. Fans objected when he took some time off to expand a short story into a prequel novel called New Spring, so he decided to shelve his plans for additional prequels in favor of finishing off the last two volumes in the series. He rejected criticisms of the later volumes of the series slowing down in pace in order to concentrate on minor secondary characters at the expense of the main characters from the opening volumes but acknowledged that his structure for the tenth volume, Crossroads of Twilight (where he showed a major scene from the prior book, Winter's Heart, from the perspective of the main characters that were not involved in the scene), had not worked out as he had planned. Knife of Dreams, the eleventh volume, had a much more positive reception from critics and fans alike and Jordan announced the twelfth volume, which he had previously announced would have the working title A Memory of Light, would conclude the series. According to Forbes, Jordan had intended for it to be the final book "even if it reaches 2,000 pages."

Jordan's death, and completion by Sanderson

Jordan was diagnosed with the terminal heart disease primary amyloidosis with cardiomyopathy in December 2005, and while he intended to finish at least A Memory of Light even if the "worse comes to worst," he made preparations in case he was not able to complete the book: "I'm getting out notes, so if the worst actually happens, someone could finish A Memory of Light and have it end the way I want it to end."

With Jordan's death on September 16, 2007, the conclusion of the series was in question. On December 7, of that year the publisher Tor Books announced that fantasy author Brandon Sanderson was to finish A Memory of Light. Sanderson, a longtime fan of the series, was chosen by Jordan's widow Harriet McDougal partly because she liked Sanderson's novels and partly because of a eulogy he had written for Jordan.

On March 30, 2009, Tor Books announced that A Memory of Light would be split into three volumes, with Brandon Sanderson citing timing and continuity reasons. By his estimate in early 2009, the book would have taken several years to write and would have reached 800,000 words. McDougal doubted that Jordan could have concluded it in a single volume. The three volumes were published from 2009 to 2013,  as The Gathering Storm, Towers of Midnight, and A Memory of Light, with the last book using Jordan's title.

After A Memory of Light 
Prior to his death, Jordan had often discussed adding an additional two prequels and an 'outrigger' sequel trilogy. In a Q&A following the release of A Memory of Light, Sanderson ruled out the completion of these works; Jordan had left very little in the way of notes for these additional novels – only two sentences in the case of the sequel trilogy.

Sanderson went on to release two cut portions of A Memory of Light as short stories. These were released in Unfettered anthologies, part of a charitable endeavour to support authors and artists with medical debt. River of Souls, a canonical segment removed from the published book due to pacing, was released in the first volume in 2013. A Fire in the Ways, a non-canon alternate sequence of events around the climax of the final book, was included in the third volume in 2019. A glossary to the series, The Wheel of Time Companion was released in 2015.

Themes and influences
The Wheel of Time is a novel from the modern fantasy genre, specifically high fantasy. The book is set in a world that is simultaneously the distant past and distant future of the real world, as a result of time being cyclical rather than linear. The opening of the first book establishes the concept:
The Wheel of Time turns, and Ages come and pass, leaving memories that become legend. Legend fades to myth, and even myth is long forgotten when the Age that gave it birth comes again. In one Age, called the Third Age by some, an Age yet to come, an Age long past, a wind rose...

Jordan acknowledged the influence of J. R. R. Tolkien, including deliberately modelling the setting of the first chapters on the Shire in The Lord of the Rings. Concepts drawn from Abrahamic religions include the duality between good and evil and between "Creator" (Light) and Shai'tan, "The Dark One" (Shaitan is an Arabic word that, in Islamic contexts, is used as a name for the Devil or Satan). Other influences include Arthurian legends, Norse mythology and Irish mythology, as well as real life history.

In addition, Jordan also drew influences from Eastern mythology, which was rare for a Western fantasy series. The concept of a wheel of time was drawn from Hinduism. Versions of the concept include the Yuga cycle in Hinduism and Kalachakra in Buddhism. The series was also influenced by the concepts of reincarnation and balance, and the symbol of the Aes Sedai resembles the yin and yang.

Fate is an important theme to the series. The series explores in great detail the implications of a common fantasy premise, in which an ordinary boy on the verge of adulthood discovers he is fated to lead a major struggle. It also deals with the divide between fate and free will. Some major characters are ta'veren, who have exceptional abilities to influence the course of history in a tumultuous period, but even they can only go so far as permitted by "The Pattern" that is being set by the Wheel of Time.

The series also featured alternative portrayals of the role of gender in society. The nature of magic in its world means that only women can safely use it. This disparity influences the power dynamics at multiple levels of its societies, including familial, communal and political levels; many of its societies are ruled by women.

Adaptations

Comic books
In 2004, Jordan sold the film, television, video game, and comic rights to the series to production company Red Eagle Entertainment. Dabel Brothers began adapting the series in comic book form, starting with the prequel New Spring in July 2005. The series initially ran on a monthly schedule, but then went on a three-year hiatus after the fifth issue. Red Eagle cited delays and changes to the creative team on the DB Pro end. The final three issues were ultimately completed and published in 2009–10.
In 2009 Dabel moved on to their adaptation of the first book of the series proper, The Eye of the World. On March 17, 2009, they showcased ten pages of art from the prelude to the series "The Wheel of Time: Eye of the World #0 – Dragonmount" on their website. Dynamite Entertainment published 35 issues of Robert Jordon's The Wheel of Time: The Eye of the World comic book series, which concluded in March 2013.

When asked in a 2013 interview about whether the comics would continue their run, Harriet McDougal replied "Well, eventually, [we'll] do the whole thing, unless it stops selling in a dreadful way. In other words, I don't really know." The 43 New Spring and Eye of the World comics were later collected together and released as a series of six graphic novels, the last of which was released in February 2015.

Games

There is a Wheel of Time MUD, identified as such or by the initialism WoTMUD, which is based on a world like that of the Wheel of Time but set in a time frame around 30 world years prior.  It has been in operation almost continuously since 1993. Notably, the WoTMUD had gained written permission from the author to use his creation including all but major characters.

A Wheel of Time computer game was released in 1999. Over the course of the game, Aes Sedai must track down a robber following an assault on the White Tower, and prevent the Dark One from being released prematurely. She eventually learns of and executes a long-forgotten ritual at Shayol Ghul to ensure the Dark Lord remains sealed within the prison. While Robert Jordan was consulted in the creation of the game, he did not write the storyline himself, and the game is not considered canon.

The Wheel of Time Roleplaying Game was released in 2001 from Wizards of the Coast using the d20 rules developed for the third edition of the Dungeons and Dragons game. The game had a single adventure module published in 2002, Prophecies of the Dragon. Shortly after the release of the adventure book Wizards of the Coast announced they would not be releasing any further products for the game. Robert Jordan cited some problems with the roleplaying game, such as storyline details in the adventure module that contradicted the books.

In early 2009 EA Games announced that they had bought the rights for a MMORPG, with the plan to publish it through the EA Partners-Program. The following year Obsidian Entertainment announced that they would be working on the project, for a PlayStation 3, Xbox 360, and PC release. However, the project was seemingly dropped around 2014.

Music
In 1999, A Soundtrack for the Wheel of Time was released, featuring music by Robert Berry and inspired by the books.

The German power metal band Blind Guardian have written two songs dedicated to the Wheel of Time series as part of their 2010 album At the Edge of Time: "Ride into Obsession" and "Wheel of Time". Swedish heavy metal band Katana also wrote a song, entitled "The Wisdom of Emond's Field", on their 2012 album Storms of War. The American power metal band Noble Beast, on their 2014 album of the same name, wrote a song entitled "The Dragon Reborn", in reference to Rand al'Thor. The American black metal band Shaidar Logoth takes its name from an adaptation of the city of Shadar Logoth, and lyrically expands on the character Padan Fain. The Austrian metal band Dragony, on their 2018 album "Masters of the Multiverse", released the song "Flame of Tar Valon", referencing the Amyrlin Seat. The Swedish metal band Freternia, on their 2019 album "The Gathering", released the song "Reborn", referencing the Dragon Reborn, Rand al'Thor. The American band Lyra wrote the song "The Sword That Could Not Be Broken", about the history of Manetheren, as well as the song "Betrayer of Hope", in reference to Ishamael. The Dread Crew of Oddwood produced the song "The Gleeman", which refers to Thom's battle with a Myrddraal in Whitebridge. The Scottish metal band Farseer, on their 2016 album "Fall Before the Dawn", released the song "Luck of the Joker", which references the most important events that happen to Matrim Cauthon during the whole series.

In the tradition of the literature-inspired symphonic poem, American composer Seth Stewart produced a full-scale orchestral work entitled "Age of Legends", inspired by the eponymous era of myth and magic described throughout the Wheel of Time series. The orchestral piece was premiered and recorded in 2011 at the Beall Concert Hall.

Television and film

In a 2000 chat on CNN.com, Robert Jordan mentioned that NBC had purchased an option to do a miniseries of The Eye of the World. But he expressed doubts that the series would be made stating "key people involved in getting that contract together have left NBC." The series was optioned by Universal Pictures in 2008 for film adaptations, with plans to adapt The Eye of the World as the first film. Neither project ultimately emerged.

In February 2015, Red Eagle Entertainment paid air time to cable network FXX to air Winter Dragon, a  low-budget 22-minute pilot for a potential The Wheel of Time series that allowed Red Eagle to hold on to the rights to the series. The pilot, based on the prologue to The Eye of the World, starred Max Ryan as Lews Therin Thelamon and Billy Zane as Ishamael and aired after Midnight with no announcements or publicity. Harriet McDougal initially stated she was unaware of the show ahead of time, and that the film rights to The Wheel of Time were set to revert to the Bandersnatch Group, her company, a few days later on February 11, 2015. Her comments triggered a slander lawsuit with Red Eagle, which was ultimately dismissed during settlement talks that July. In an interview with io9, Red Eagle Entertainment's CEO Rick Selvage stated "it was more of an [issue of] getting it on the air."  A spokesman for FXX stated that the channel was paid to air the show, but Selvage hinted that it was indeed produced with a future series in mind. "We think there's huge demand for the television series internationally, and we're looking forward to producing it and getting it out in the marketplace."

On April 29, 2016, Harriet McDougal confirmed that the legal issues had been resolved and that a TV series was in development. Further details emerged on 20 April 2017, when it was announced that Sony Pictures Television would be handling the adaptation, with Rafe Judkins as writer and executive producer. In February 2018, Amazon Studios revealed that it had struck a deal with Sony Pictures Television to co-develop the series for distribution on Amazon's video streaming service. The series was formally greenlit in October 2018. Production began in late 2019, but was hindered in part due to the COVID-19 pandemic. The series premiered on 19 November 2021.

Fan culture
Many fans of The Wheel of Time attend Dragon Con, which had an exclusive Wheel of Time content track from 2001 through 2012. The Wheel of Time now has its own annual convention, JordanCon, which has been held annually in Atlanta, Georgia, since 2009. The 2020 convention was cancelled due to the COVID-19 pandemic.

References

External links

 Dragonmount
 Tor Books official Robert Jordan web site
 Brandon Sanderson's web site

 
Fantasy novel series
Sequel novels
High fantasy novels
Tor Books books
Novels adapted into video games
American novels adapted into television shows